The following lists events that happened during 1893 in Chile.

Incumbents
President of Chile: Jorge Montt

Events

October
28 October - The Banco de Chile is founded.

November
27 November - The Santiago Stock Exchange is founded.

Births
1 January - Arturo Friedemann
11 January - Florencio Durán (died 1978)

Deaths
 7 December - Ramón Cabieses (born 1814), sailor
Date unknown - Jacinto Chacón (born 1820)

References 

 
Years of the 19th century in Chile
Chile